Glog may refer to:

 G-Log, an American software company acquired by Oracle in 2005
 GLOG, the Euronext ticker symbol for Global Graphics, a software company
 Glog, a portmanteau of “graphical blog” coined by the company Glogster
 Glog, a Slovene, Bosnian, Montenegrin, Serbian, and Croatian word for hawthorn (Crataegus); see Głogów
 Glögg, a Nordic mulled wine